Valerio Tebaldi (born 2 July 1965) is a former Italian professional road bicycle racer. Tebaldi was born at Chiuduno.  He won a stage in the 1988 Tour de France and in the 1989 Tour de France.

Major results

1988
Tour de France:
Winner stage 7
1989
Tour de France:
Winner stage 12

External links 

Italian male cyclists
1965 births
Living people
Italian Tour de France stage winners
Cyclists from the Province of Bergamo